The Finance Tower is a skyscraper in the Northern Quarter central business district of Brussels, Belgium. It was designed by the architects Hugo Van Kuyck, Marcel Lambrichs and Léon Stynen and built between 1968 and 1982. It is the second tallest building in Belgium after the Tour du Midi, and has the most office space of any building in Belgium.

The Finance Tower is situated to the crossroads of the / and the Rue Royale/Koningsstraat. It is served by many public transit systems, including Botanique/Kruidtuin metro station and Brussels-Central and Brussels-North railway stations.

History

Purpose
The Finance Tower is part of a wider body: the State Administrative City ( or CAE,  or RAC), a complex in the International Style, whose objective was to group together the country's public administration in order to increase productivity and to reduce the functioning wastes. The site was preferred because of its ease of access, most notably with the proximity of Brussels Central Station. On top of this, the works of the North–South connection made the neighbourhood lifeless, and it was necessary to recreate a liaison between the upper and lower city.

Construction
The tower is located on a site with a 13-metre difference between the highest and lowest altitudes. Producing the preliminary documents took nearly four years, from 1968 to 1972. Searches were performed down to a depth of 26 metres. The building of the foundations was made difficult by the presence of a water-logged clay terrain as well as by the tunnel of the North–South connection.

Budget restrictions slowed down the construction; work was practically paralysed from 1974 to 1978. The works resumed in 1978. Major work was finally finished in February 1981, but it was the end of 1983 before the tower at last opened its doors. Its external elevator core was intended to have had a marble facade, but this was scrapped because of the high cost.

Renovation (2005–2008)
The Finance Tower was involved in a large-scale renovation between January 2005 and 2008. The plan comes about it back to the office of architects of Maurice Mottle. It involved replacing the old facade with a light blue and white curtain wall, removal of all asbestos, the dismantling of the external elevator core and the building of new elevators inside the building. The office space lost by this move is compensated for by a new 11-storey building constructed to the east of the tower. The renovated building provides office space for 4,600 workers, an increase from the 3,200 prior to renovation.

The antenna, which is mounted on top of the tower, serves the two Belgian national television stations and is used only for digital broadcast.

Art

Right in front of the Finance Tower one finds the sculpture L'Âme Sentinelle (by Nat Neujean) of two females embracing. In individualistic Belgian fashion, this is rather an evocative and erotically-themed sculpture.
One of the two women is more classically feminine in appearance, the other looks more like a man, though one quickly sees she also female. The pose is enigmatic, with the shorter-haired woman firmly grasping the wrist of the longer-haired woman behind her back, almost wrestling her into submission, while both look away from each other despite being nude and intimate.

See also

 Astro Tower
 North Galaxy Towers
 Madou Plaza Tower
 Proximus Towers
 Rogier Tower
 World Trade Center (Brussels)

References

External links

 Finance Tower at Emporis
 Finance Tower at Jaspers-Eyers Architects

Buildings and structures in Brussels
Skyscraper office buildings in Belgium
1982 establishments in Belgium
Office buildings completed in 1982